The following highways are numbered 951:

Canada

United States